Cannabis in Liberia is illegal.

History
During the First Liberian Civil War, Charles Taylor raised funds for his fighters by selling cannabis from territories under National Patriotic Front of Liberia control.

References

Liberia
Drugs in Liberia